Beijing Aerospace Flight Control Center, formerly known as Beijing Aerospace Command and Control Center (BACCC or BACC), is a command center for the Chinese space program which includes the Shenzhou missions, and is located in a suburb northwest of Beijing under the administration of Haidian District.  The space center main entrance is located at the intersection of Beiqing Road and You Yi Road as shown by the photograph.

The space center is supervised and managed by the government of the People's Republic of China.

BACC's primary functions include supervision, telemetry, tracking and command of spacecraft.  The building is inside a complex nicknamed Aerospace City. It was initially created for China's crewed space missions, a.k.a. "Project 921", hence also the name "921" among some insiders. It has evolved to be responsible for the Chang'e 1 mission and the Sino-Russian Interplanetary Space Mission, Fobos-Grunt. The BACC also oversees Shenzhou missions with the help of four Yuan Wang-class tracking ships. It has dedicated subsidiaries for SINOSAT and Inmarsat.
It was renamed to 北京航天飞行控制中心 (literally: Beijing Aerospace Flight Control Center) in 2006.  As of March, 2009, no official announcement has been made to revise its formal name in English in accordance with its new Chinese name.

See also
Xi'an Satellite Control Center
Chinese space program

References

Chinese space program facilities